The Corpus Domini Monastery is a monastery at 4 via Pergolato in Ferrara. It first was founded as a house of penitent women, and became a Poor Clares Observant Franciscan convent in 1431. It was the home of Caterina Vigri (St. Catherine of Bologna) from 1431-1456. She served as the mistress of novices, teaching about 100 women to become pious nuns. She was also an artist who illuminated her own breviary and is said to have decorated the walls of the convent with images of the Christ Child. These were lost or destroyed in a fire in 1667. The public church was redecorated in the late-Baroque period. On its high altar is Communion of the Apostles by Giambettino Cignaroli (1768), whilst the church's ceiling fresco Glory of Saint Catherina Vegri is by Giuseppe Ghedini (1770–1773).
The house is still a monastery; a community of Franciscan nuns, called Poor Clares after S. Clare their founder and companion to S. Francis. One of their abbesses was the daughter of Lucrezia Borgia, Leonara d'Este. She is now recognised as one of the earliest writers of polyphonic choral music for women.

Notable burials

The church is the burial-place for several members of the House of Este:
 Leonello d'Este
 Eleanor of Naples
 Niccolò III d'Este
 Ricciarda, Marchioness of Saluzzo
 Ercole I d'Este
 Sigismondo d'Este
 Alfonso I d'Este, Duke of Ferrara
 Giulio d'Este
 Ferrante d'Este
 Ercole II d'Este
 Eleonora d'Este
 Lucrezia Borgia
 Lucrezia de' Medici
 Alfonso II d'Este

External links

Buildings and structures in Ferrara
Burial sites of the House of Este
Monasteries in Emilia-Romagna
Roman Catholic churches in Ferrara